Tom Butler was an American pioneer professional track cyclist. He won the national sprint title in 1898 and finished second at the 1899 UCI Track Cycling World Championships. His elder brothers Nat and Frank were also professional cyclists; the brothers often competed together, working as a team against other riders. This was also the case at the 1899 World Championships, where Nat finished fourth.

References 

1877 births
Date of death unknown
American male cyclists